, NVLU in short, is a private university in Musashino, Tokyo, Japan. The predecessor of the school was founded 1881, and it was chartered as a university in 1949. Since 1952 NVLU has been merged into the Nippon Medical School (日本医科大学 Nihon ika daigaku), although they maintain separate identities for the medical and veterinary schools.

External links
 Official website 
 Official website (in English)

Educational institutions established in 1909
Private universities and colleges in Japan
Universities and colleges in Tokyo
1909 establishments in Japan
Veterinary schools in Japan
Musashino, Tokyo